Jean-Marie Gustave Le Clézio (13 April 1940), usually identified as J. M. G. Le Clézio, of French and Mauritian nationality, is a writer and professor. The author of over forty works, he was awarded the 1963 Prix Renaudot for his novel Le Procès-Verbal and the 2008 Nobel Prize in Literature for his life's work, as an "author of new departures, poetic adventure and sensual ecstasy, explorer of a humanity beyond and below the reigning civilization".

Biography
Le Clézio's mother was born in the French Riviera city of Nice, his father on the island of Mauritius (which was a British possession, but his father was ethnically Breton). Both his father's and his mother's ancestors were originally from Morbihan, on the south coast of Brittany.
His paternal ancestor François Alexis Le Clézio fled France in 1798 and settled with his wife and daughter on Mauritius, which was then a French colony but would soon pass into British hands. The colonists were allowed to maintain their customs and use of the French language. Le Clézio has never lived in Mauritius for more than a few months at a time, but he has stated that he regards himself both as a Frenchman and a Mauritian. He has dual French and Mauritian citizenship (Mauritius gained independence in 1968) and calls Mauritius his "little fatherland".

Le Clézio was born in Nice, his mother's native city, during World War II when his father was serving in the British Army in Nigeria. He was raised in Roquebillière, a small village near Nice until 1948 when he, his mother, and his brother boarded a ship to join his father in Nigeria. His 1991 novel Onitsha is partly autobiographical. In a 2004 essay, he reminisced about his childhood in Nigeria and his relationship with his parents.

After studying at the University of Bristol in England from 1958 to 1959, Le Clézio finished his undergraduate degree at Nice's Institut d'études littéraires. In 1964 Le Clézio earned a master's degree from the University of Provence with a thesis on Henri Michaux.

After several years spent in London and Bristol, Le Clézio moved to the United States to work as a teacher. During 1967 he served as an aid worker in Thailand as part of his national service, but was quickly expelled from the country for protesting against child prostitution and sent to Mexico to finish his national service. From 1970 to 1974, he lived with the Embera-Wounaan tribe in Panama. He has been married since 1975 to Jémia Jean, who is Moroccan, and has three daughters (one by his first marriage with Rosalie Piquemal). Since the 1990s they have divided their residence between Albuquerque, Mauritius, and Nice.

In 1983 Le Clézio wrote a doctoral thesis on colonial Mexican history for the University of Perpignan, on the conquest of the Purépecha people who inhabit the present-day state of Michoacán. It was serialized in a French magazine and published in Spanish in 1985.

Le Clézio has taught at a number of universities around the world. A frequent visitor to South Korea, he taught French language and literature at Ewha Womans University in Seoul during the 2007 academic year. In November 2013, Le Clézio joined Nanjing University in China as a professor.

Literary career 
Le Clézio began writing at the age of seven; his first work was a book about the sea. He achieved success at the age of 23, when his first novel, Le Procès-Verbal (The Interrogation), was the Prix Renaudot and was shortlisted for the Prix Goncourt. Since then he has published more than thirty-six books, including short stories, novels, essays, two translations on the subject of Native American mythology, and several children's books.

From 1963 to 1975, Le Clézio explored themes such as insanity, language, nature, and writing. He devoted himself to formal experimentation in the wake of such contemporaries as Georges Perec or Michel Butor. His persona was that of an innovator and a rebel, for which he was praised by Michel Foucault and Gilles Deleuze.

During the late 1970s, Le Clézio's style changed drastically; he abandoned experimentation, and the mood of his novels became less tormented as he used themes like childhood, adolescence, and traveling, which attracted a broader audience. In 1980, Le Clézio was the first winner of the newly created Grand Prix Paul Morand, awarded by the Académie Française, for his novel Désert. In 1994, a survey conducted by the French literary magazine Lire showed that 13 percent of the readers considered him to be the greatest living French-language writer.

Nobel Prize

The Nobel Prize in Literature for 2008 went to Le Clézio for works characterized by the Swedish Academy as being "poetic adventure and sensual ecstasy" and for being focused on the environment, especially the desert. The Swedish Academy, in announcing the award, called Le Clézio an "author of new departures, poetic adventure and sensual ecstasy, explorer of a humanity beyond and below the reigning civilization." Le Clézio used his Nobel prize acceptance lecture to attack the subject of information poverty. The title of his lecture was Dans la forêt des paradoxes ("In the forest of paradoxes"), a title he attributed to Stig Dagerman.

Gao Xingjian, a Chinese émigré writing in Mandarin, was the previous French citizen to receive the prize (for 2000); Le Clézio was the first French-language writer to receive the Nobel Prize in Literature since Claude Simon for 1985, and the fourteenth since Sully Prudhomme, laureate of the first prize of 1901.

Controversy
Le Clézio is a staunch defender of Mama Rosa, director of a Mexican shelter raided by the police in July 2014 when children were found eating rotten food and kept against the will of their parents. He wrote an article in Le Monde arguing that she is close to sanctity.

Bibliography

Novels 

 Le Procès-verbal (1963). The Interrogation, trans. Daphne Woodward (1964).
Le Déluge (1966). The Flood, trans. Peter Green (1967).
 Terra Amata (1967). Terra Amata, trans. Barbara Bray (1967).
 Le Livre des fuites (1969). The Book of Flights, trans. Simon Watson-Taylor (1971).
 La Guerre (1970). War, trans. Simon Watson-Taylor (1973).
 Les Géants (1973). The Giants, trans. Simon Watson-Taylor (1975).
 Voyages de l'autre côté (1975). 
 Désert (1980). Desert, trans. C. Dickson (2009).
 Le Chercheur d'or (1985). The Prospector, trans. Carol Marks (1993); C. Dickson (2016).
 Onitsha (1991). Onitsha, trans. Alison Anderson (1997).
 Étoile errante (1992). Wandering Star, trans. C. Dickson (2005).
 La Quarantaine (1995).
 Poisson d'or (1997). 
Révolutions (2003).
 Ourania (2006).
 Ritournelle de la faim (2008). 
Alma (2017).

Short stories and novellas 
Le Jour où Beaumont fit connaissance avec sa douleur (1964). The Day Beaumont Became Acquainted with His Pain.
La Fièvre (1965). Fever, trans. Daphne Woodward (1966)
Mondo et autres histoires (1978). Mondo and Other Stories, trans. Alison Anderson (2011).
La Ronde et autres faits divers (1982). The Round & Other Cold Hard Facts, trans. C. Dickson (2002).
Printemps et autres saisons (1989)
Awaité Pawana (1992). Pawana, trans. Brunski (2008).
La Fête chantée et autres essais de thème amérindien (1997)
Hasard suivi d'Angoli Mala (1999)
Cœur brûle et autres romances (2000)
Fantômes dans la rue (2000). Ghosts in the Street.
Tabataba suivi de Pawana (2002)
Histoire du pied et autres fantaisies (2011)
Tempête : deux novellas (2014). Storm.

Non-fiction 

 Le Rêve mexicain ou La Pensée interrompue (1965). The Mexican Dream, Or, The Interrupted Thought of Amerindian Civilizations, trans. Teresa Lavender Fagan (1993).
"Sur la lecture comme le vrai voyage" (1965). "On Reading as True Travel", trans. Julia Abramson.
"La Liberté pour rêver" (1965). "Freedom to Dream", trans. Ralph Schoolcraft.
"La Liberté pour parler" (1965). "Freedom to Speak", trans. Le Clézio.
 L'extase matérielle (1967). Material Ecstasy.
 Conversations avec J. M. G. Le Clézio (1971)
Haï (1971)
 Mydriase (1973). Mydriasis, trans. Teresa Lavender Fagan, published in Mydriasis: Followed by “To the Icebergs” (2019).
 Vers les icebergs (1978). To the Icebergs, trans. Teresa Lavender Fagan, published in Mydriasis: Followed by “To the Icebergs” (2019).
 L'Inconnu sur la Terre (1978)
 Trois Villes saintes (1980)
Une lettre de J. M. G. Le Clézio (1982)
Sur Lautréamont (1987)
 Diego et Frida (1993)
 Ailleurs (1995)
 Dans la maison d'Edith (1997)
Enfances (1998)
L'Africain (2004). The African, trans. C. Dickson (2013).
Ballaciner (2007)
Chanson bretonne suivi de L'Enfant et la guerre (2020).

Travel diaries 

 Voyage à Rodrigues
 Gens des nuages
 Raga. Approche du continent invisible

Collections translated by the author into French 

 Les Prophéties du Chilam Balam
 Relation de Michoacan
 Sirandanes

Books for children 

 Celui qui n'avait jamais vu la mer (The Boy Who Had Never Seen the Sea)
 Lullaby
 Voyage au pays des arbres
 Villa Aurore ; suivi de, Orlamonde
 Villa Aurore
 L'Enfant de sous le pont
 La Grande Vie suivi de Peuple du ciel
 Peuple du ciel, suivi de 'Les Bergers 
 Balaabilou

Books written by other authors with preface written by Le Clézio 

 The French language preface to Juan Rulfo's   short story collection "Le Llano en flammes"
 Preface to French filmmaker Robert Bresson's "Notes Sur Le Cinématographe"
See also: J. M. G. Le Clézio bibliography.

Awards and honors

Awards

Honours 
 He was made Chevalier (Knight) of the Légion d'honneur on 25 October 1991 and was promoted to Officier (Officer) in 2009
 In 1996, he was made Officier (Officer) of the Ordre national du Mérite.
Lycée Français J. M. G. Le Clézio in Port Vila, Vanuatu is named after him.

References

Further reading
Critical works
 Jennifer R. Waelti-Walters, J.M.G. Le Clézio, Boston, Twayne, " Twayne's World Authors Series " 426, 1977.
 Jennifer R. Waelti-Walters, Icare ou l'évasion impossible, éditions Naaman, Sherbrooke, Canada, 1981.
 Bruno Thibault, Sophie Jollin-Bertocchi, J.M.G. Le Clézio: Intertextualité et interculturalité, Nantes, Editions du Temps, 2004.
 Bruno Thibault, Bénédicte Mauguière,  J.M.G. Le Clézio, la francophonie et la question coloniale, Nouvelles Etudes Francophones, numéro 20, 2005.
 Keith Moser, "Privileged moments" in the novels and short stories of J.M.G. Le Clézio, Edwin Mellen Press, 2008.
 Bruno Thibault, Claude Cavallero (eds), Contes, nouvelles & Romances, Les Cahiers Le Clézio, vol. 2, Paris, 2009.
 Bruno Thibault, J.M.G. Le Clézio et la métaphore exotique, Amsterdam/New York, Rodopi, 2009.
 Isabelle Roussel-Gillet, J.M.G. Le Clézio, écrivain de l'incertitude, Ellipses, 2011.
 Bruno Thibault, Isabelle Roussel-Gillet (eds), Migrations et métissages, Les Cahiers Le Clézio, vol. 3–4, 2011.
 Keith Moser, JMG Le Clézio, A Concerned Citizen of the Global Village, Lexington Books, 2012.
 Bruno Thibault, Keith Moser, J.M.G. Le Clézio dans la forêt des paradoxes, Paris, Editions de l'Harmattan, 2012.

External links

Great interview with J. M. G. Le Clezio and all linked resources on the video encyclopedia SAM Network

 
Interview with Jean-Marie Gustave Le Clézio, in Label France No. 45 (English)
J.M.G Le Clézio —Photos by Mathieu Bourgois.
J.M.G. Le Clézio, about his Breton origins.
"Nobel Goes Global With Literary Prize", by Bob Thompson, Washington Post, 10 October 2008
"A Nobel Undertaking: Getting to Know Le Clézio ", by Richard Woodward, Wall Street Journal, 30 October 2008
"J. M. G. Le Clézio, Nobel laureate": a collection of pieces on Clézio, from TLS, 9 October 2008
A writing life in pictures: Nobel laureate Jean-Marie Le Clézio, The Guardian, 9 October 2008
Artelittera Many chapters of studies about Le Clezio to upload
J.M.G. Le Clézio: A French NovelistWins 2008 Nobel Prize for Literature
David R. Godine, Publisher
 
List of Works

1940 births
Living people
People from Nice
Mauritian people of French descent
French people of Breton descent
Alumni of the University of Bristol
French Nobel laureates
French travel writers
Writers from Provence-Alpes-Côte d'Azur
Mauritian Nobel laureates
Nobel laureates in Literature
Officiers of the Légion d'honneur
Officers of the Ordre national du Mérite
Prix Renaudot winners
Prix Valery Larbaud winners
Grand prix Jean Giono recipients
University of Provence alumni
20th-century French novelists
21st-century French novelists
Postmodern writers
French expatriates in Nigeria
French expatriates in the United Kingdom
French expatriates in the United States
French male novelists
Côte d'Azur University alumni